The Colonel and the King is a 1911 American silent short drama film produced by the Thanhouser Company. The film stars William Garwood, Marie Eline and William Russell.

External links

1911 drama films
1911 films
Thanhouser Company films
Silent American drama films
American silent short films
American black-and-white films
1911 short films
1910s American films